Kylie Shea Lewallen (born May 6, 1986), known professionally as Kylie Shea, is an American ballet dancer. She is a former principal dancer with Spectrum Dance Theater.

Biography 
Lewallen was born on May 6, 1986 in Los Angeles, California. She is the younger sister of Scott Lewallen, an actor and co-founder of Grindr. She started training in classical ballet when she was eight years old at Dance Peninsula Ballet. She was a member of her high school's dance team, serving as captain her junior and senior years. She moved to Seattle, where she was a principal dancer with Spectrum Dance Theater for four years. She retired from the classical stage and moved back to Los Angeles to pursue a career as a commercial dancer.

Lewallen has been featured in the American television series Glee and in Bruno Mars' music video Gorilla as a dancer. She has also performed live with Mars, Ariana Grande, and Adam Lambert. In May 2018 she starred in a music video titled Remind Me to Forget by Kygo and Miguel.

In June 2016 Lewallen founded #PointeChronicles, a ballet improvisation project on social media platforms. In February 2018 she spoke out about the importance of body positivity in the dance industry.

She is the author of the children's book Save Your Tears For the Stage. She also is the creator and designer behind F'Lingerie, a line of lingerie.

Lewallen danced with Rob McElhenney in a five-minute-long contemporary dance work in the episode Mac Finds His Pride for the thirteenth season of the American sitcom It's Always Sunny in Philadelphia.

Kylie Shea appears in the movie Magic Mike's Last Dance which released on February 10, 2023

References 

Living people
1986 births
21st-century American ballet dancers
American ballerinas
Dancers from California
People from Los Angeles
21st-century American women